The 2021 U-18 Baseball World Cup or the XXIX U-18 Baseball World Cup is an international baseball tournament held by the World Baseball Softball Confederation for players 18-year-old and younger held in Bradenton and Sarasota, Florida, USA. The event was originally scheduled in 2021, but due to the COVID-19 pandemic, was postponed to 2022.

Format
First round: The twelve participating nations were drawn into two groups of 6, in which single round robin will occur. The top 3 nations from each group advances to the Super Round, while the bottom 3 nations from each group advance to the consolation round.

Consolation round: The 6 nations in this round play one game against the teams they have not played yet. (example: The 4th placed team from Group A will play the bottom three teams from Group B)

Super round: The format in the super round is similar to that of the consolation round. Each team plays the top three teams from the opposing group. (example: The 1st placed team from Group B will play the top three teams from Group A) The standings for this round will include the 2 games played against the 2 other second-round qualifiers from the team's first-round group, and the 3 games played in the second round, for a total of 5 games. The 3rd and 4th-place finishers advance to the bronze-medal game, and the 1st and 2nd-place finishers advance to the gold-medal game.

Finals: The Finals consist of the Bronze Medal Game, contested by the 3rd and 4th-place finishers, and the gold-medal game, contested by the 1st and 2nd-place finishers.

Teams
The following 12 teams qualified for the tournament.

1Republic of China, commonly known as Taiwan, due to complicated relations with People's Republic of China, is recognized by the name Chinese Taipei by most of the international organizations in sports competitions. For more information, please see Cross-Strait relations.

First round

Group A

|}

Group B

|}

Super round

|}

consolation round

|}

Finals

Third place gameChampionship

|}

Championship

|}

Medalists

Final standings

U-18 All-World Team

Statistics leaders

References

External links
Event Official Website
Event Official Website at WBSC

U-18 Baseball World Cup
U-18 Baseball World Cup
Baseball
Baseball
Baseball competitions in Florida
Sports in Bradenton, Florida
Sports in Sarasota, Florida